Henry Hitt Watkins (June 24, 1866 – September 8, 1947) was a United States district judge of the United States District Court for the Western District of South Carolina.

Education and career

Born in Laurens County, South Carolina, Watkins  attended the University of Virginia and received a Master of Arts degree from Furman University in 1883. He read law to enter the bar in 1892, and was in private practice in Anderson, South Carolina from then until 1919. He was in the United States Army, Company C, First South Carolina Regiment in 1898, where he achieved the rank of captain. He was Quartermaster General for Governor Duncan Clinch Heyward from 1903 to 1907.

Federal judicial service

On July 14, 1919, Watkins was nominated by President Woodrow Wilson to a seat on the United States District Court for the Western District of South Carolina vacated by Joseph T. Johnson. Watkins was confirmed by the United States Senate on July 22, 1919, and received his commission the same day. He assumed senior status on December 31, 1936, serving in that capacity until his death on September 8, 1947.

References

Sources
 

1866 births
1947 deaths
Judges of the United States District Court for the Western District of South Carolina
United States district court judges appointed by Woodrow Wilson
20th-century American judges
United States Army officers
People from Laurens County, South Carolina
University of Virginia alumni
Furman University alumni
South Carolina lawyers
19th-century American lawyers
20th-century American lawyers
United States federal judges admitted to the practice of law by reading law